The 8th World Freestyle Skating Championships were held in Paris, France from October 22 to October 26, 2014. 35 countries took part in the competition.

Participating nations
35 nations entered the competition.

Medallists

Medal table

References

External links

Event website

Freestyle Skating Championships
2014 in French sport
Skating
Roller skating competitions
2014 in roller sports
2014 in Paris